Herman Aguinis (born 1966) is a researcher and business professor and author. He is the Avram Tucker Distinguished Scholar and Professor of Management at the George Washington University School of Business in Washington, D.C.  He has been ranked among the top 100 most influential economics and business researchers in the world every year since 2018. He has been elected for the presidency track of the Academy of Management (AOM), served as AOM Vice President and Program Chair for the 2020 virtual conference including about 7,200 participants from 90 countries, served as President during 2021-2022, and is now serving as Immediate Past President. Prior to moving to Washington D.C. in 2016, he was the John F. Mee Chair of Management and the Founding Director of the Institute for Global Organizational Effectiveness in the Kelley School of Business at Indiana University.

Early life and education 
Herman Aguinis was born in Rio Cuarto, Cordoba (Argentina).  He is the son of the Argentine author Marcos Aguinis and University of Buenos Aires School of Law professor Ana Maria "Marita" Aguinis (deceased). He attended high school at the Colegio Nacional de Buenos Aires before receiving a Bachelors’ and master's degree in psychology from the University of Buenos Aires. He spent part of his high school years in New York City, but following his schooling in Argentina, he moved to the United States permanently to study Industrial and Organizational Psychology, earning a Master’s and then a PhD degree from the University at Albany, State University of New York in 1993.

Career
Aguinis' research, teaching, and consulting are about the acquisition and deployment of talent in organizations and organizational research methods (i.e., behavioral science and data science). He has written extensively on the topics of star performance, corporate social responsibility & business sustainability, domestic and international workforce diversity, leadership, staffing, training and development, performance management, and innovative methodological approaches for developing and testing theories. His research has been featured by the media worldwide, including the Wall Street Journal, and in U.S. Supreme Court cases. He served as Editor-in-Chief of Organizational Research Methods (2005-2007) and has served or serves on the editorial board of 26 journals including Journal of Applied Psychology, Personnel Psychology (journal), Journal of Management, and Journal of International Business Studies.

Dr. Herman Aguinis has delivered about 300 keynote addresses and presentations at professional conferences, delivered about 150 invited presentations in all seven continents except for Antarctica, and raised about $5MM for his research and teaching endeavors from private foundations and federal sources (e.g., National Science Foundation).

Impact, awards and honors
Aguinis' research has placed him as one of the most influential and prolific contemporary management professors in the world. Every year since 2018, he has been ranked among the top-100 most impactful researchers in the world in economics and business (based on multiple articles published in the preceding decade ranked in the top 1% by citations), “demonstrating significant influence among their peers, this top 1% of the global research community represent magnets in their respective discipline.” A 2023 Journal of Business Research article ranked as the #4 most dominant researcher in the area of strategic leadership from 1980-2020, the #4 most productive between 2011-2020, and the #12 most productive between 1980-2020 based on the Scopus database. A study conducted in November 2022 involving 166,880 scientists ranked as the #38 best researcher in Business and Management in the United States and #68 in the world based on the D-index (Discipline H-index), which includes papers and citation values for an examined discipline. Another article published in 2019 in Journal of Business Research article ranked him as the #1 most cited and prolific (i.e., based on h-index) researcher in the field of human resources training based on all publications between 1975 and 2016. A 2019 Leadership Quarterly article as the world’s #2 most influential researcher in the field of leadership based on all articles published in 10 highly prestigious academic journals between 2011 and 2017. A 2017 Decision Sciences Journal of Innovative Education article ranked him among the top 100 most published authors in business and management education (BME) out of 7,209 unique authors who published at least one article in 17 BME journals from 2005 to 2014. A 2016 Journal of Management (JOM) article published to celebrate the journal's 40th anniversary ranked him as the #5 most published author from 1975 to 2014 out of 2,270 different individuals who published at least one article each. Based on Google Scholar, his work has received about 48,000 citations (h-index = 97), he is the world's #1 ranked researcher in the category "workforce diversity," #2 in “talent management,” #1 in “people analytics,” #1 in "business sustainability," and #3 in “corporate social responsibility”. Based on Web of Science/Clarivate Analytics, his work has received about 17,000 citations. He has about 30,000 LinkedIn followers.

He is a fellow of the Academy of Management (and also served as Deputy Dean of the Academy of Management Fellows until August 2018), American Psychological Association, Society for Industrial and Organizational Psychology, and Association for Psychological Science and has received many awards such as:

 Losey Award by the Society for Human Resource Management Foundation for lifetime achievement in human resource research
 Academy of Management Research Methods Division Distinguished Career Award for lifetime contributions
Society for Industrial and Organizational Psychology Scientific Contributions Award for lifetime contributions
 Academy of Management Practice Theme Committee Scholar Practice Impact Award recognizing an outstanding scholar who has affected policy making and managerial and organizational practices
 IACMR-Responsible Research in Management Award recognizing excellent scholarship that focuses on important issues for business and society using sound research methods with credible results
 Academy of Management Entrepreneurship Division IDEA Thought Leader Award
 Academy of Management Research Methods Division Robert McDonald Advancement of Organizational Research Methodology Award
 Inducted into The PhD Project Hall of Fame.
 Seven best article of the year awards from the journals Personnel Psychology, Journal of Management, Journal of Organizational Behavior (twice), Academy of Management Perspectives, Organizational Research Methods, and Management Research.

Selected publications
Herman Aguinis has published nine books and about 200 peer-reviewed journal articles.

Books
 Aguinis, H. 2019. Performance management for dummies. Hoboken, NJ: Wiley. .
 Aguinis, H. 2023. Performance management (5th ed.). Chicago, IL: Chicago Business Press. .
 Cascio, W.F., & Aguinis, H. 2019. Applied psychology in talent management (8th ed.). Thousand Oaks, CA: SAGE. . 
 Aguinis, H. 2004. Regression analysis for categorical moderators. New York, NY: Guilford. .
 Baruch, Y., Konrad, A.M., Aguinis, H., & Starbuck, W.H. (Eds.). 2008. Opening the black box of editorship. New York, NY: Palgrave-Macmillan. . 
 Aguinis, H. (Ed.). 2004. Test-score banding in human resource selection: Legal, technical, and societal issues. Westport, CT: Praeger. .

Journal articles

References

External links
 Herman Aguinis George Washington University page
 Herman Aguinis personal page
 Link for downloadable pdf versions of journal articles authored by Herman Aguinis
 Herman Aguinis Google Scholar profile and publications
 Herman Aguinis ResearchGate profile and publications
 List of books by Herman Aguinis

Management scientists
American business theorists
American male non-fiction writers
Argentine business theorists
American social sciences writers
American psychology writers
1966 births
Living people
George Washington University School of Business faculty
University at Albany, SUNY alumni